Li Dong-Woon (born 4 July 1945) is a North Korean football forward who played for North Korea in the 1966 FIFA World Cup. There he scored against Portugal in the Quarter-finals at Goodison Park. He played club football for Rodongja and for Pyongyang, after the former club was absorbed by the latter.

References

1945 births
Sportspeople from Pyongyang
North Korean footballers
North Korea international footballers
Association football forwards
1966 FIFA World Cup players
Living people
Rodongja Sports Club players
Pyongyang Sports Club players